Auricular may refer to anything heard, such as "auricular evidence", or:

Medicine and anatomy
 A relational adjective, as in the auricular branch of vagus nerve, used to delineate a relationship to the ear and its structures
 A synonym for atrial, of or pertaining to the atrium (heart)

Arts
 The Auricular style, a 17th-century style in decorative art, especially Dutch metalwork

See also
 Auricula (plural auriculae), auricle, or pinna, the visible part of the outer ear
 Auricle (disambiguation)
 Auricle, a synonym for the atrium (heart)